Stonegate is an unincorporated community and a census-designated place (CDP) located in and governed by Douglas County, Colorado, United States. The CDP is a part of the Denver–Aurora–Lakewood, CO Metropolitan Statistical Area. The population of the Stonegate CDP was 8,962 at the United States Census 2010. The Stonegate Village Metropolitan District provides services to the community, which lies in ZIP Code 80134.

Geography
Stonegate is located in northeastern Douglas County. It is bordered to the east by the town of Parker and to the west by unincorporated Grand View Estates.

The E-470 toll road around the eastern side of the Denver-Aurora metropolitan area forms the northern edge of Stonegate, with access from Exits 3 and 4.

Demographics

Education
The Douglas County School District serves Stonegate.

See also

Outline of Colorado
Index of Colorado-related articles
State of Colorado
Colorado cities and towns
Colorado census designated places
Colorado counties
Douglas County, Colorado
List of statistical areas in Colorado
Front Range Urban Corridor
North Central Colorado Urban Area
Denver-Aurora-Boulder, CO Combined Statistical Area
Denver-Aurora-Broomfield, CO Metropolitan Statistical Area

References

External links

Stonegate Village Metropolitan District
Douglas County website

Census-designated places in Douglas County, Colorado
Census-designated places in Colorado
Denver metropolitan area